Go! with the Times is an album recorded in November 1980 but released in 1985 by West London post-punk/indie band the Times.<ref name="Discogs.com">[http://www.discogs.com/Times-Go-With-The-Times/release/980002 The Times on Discogs.com]</ref>

Track listing
Side A
"You Can Get It"
"I'm with You"
"Your Generation"
"Pinstripes"
"Dressing Up for the Cameras"
"Red with Purple Flashes"
Side B
"The Jokes on Zandra"
"Nowhere to Run"
"No Hard Feelings"
"My Andy Warhol Poster"
"Man from Uncle"
"Reflections in an Imperfect Mirror"

Personnel
 John East (bass, vocals)
 Paul Damien (drums, vocals)
 Edward Ball (vocals, guitar)

References

The Times (band) albums
1985 albums